Psychic Killer is a 1975 American slasher film directed by Ray Danton and written by Greydon Clark, Mikel Angel and Ray Danton. The film stars Paul Burke, Jim Hutton, Julie Adams, Nehemiah Persoff, Neville Brand and Aldo Ray. The film was released in December 1975, by AVCO Embassy Pictures. Originally released under the alternate title The Kirlian Force, it was changed to Psychic Killer to emphasize the more sensational horror scenes of the film.

This was the final theatrical film for both Jim Hutton and Paul Burke.

Plot
Arnold Masters (Jim Hutton) is a young man serving time in an institution for the criminally insane for a crime he did not commit.

Arnold reveals his situation to a fellow inmate: His mother was very sick, and needed an operation to remove a tumor. But due to Arnold's mother having no insurance, the doctor did not perform the operation. When Arnold returned to the doctor's office, the doctor was found dead, and Arnold was framed for the crime. A speedy trial resulted in Arnold's testimony being used against him, and as a result, he was found not guilty of murder by reason of insanity. And during his time in the institution, his mother had died, which Arnold did not know about until six months later.

An inmate gives Arnold an amulet, in which Arnold learns astral projection - the art of leaving one's physical body and transporting the soul elsewhere. Arnold is soon freed from the institution after the doctor's real killer was caught and confessed to the crime. Soon after, Arnold begins using his newfound power of astral projection to kill those he feel were responsible for his incarceration and his mother's death.

Among Arnold's victims are a court appointed psychiatrist whose testimony at Arnold's trial sealed his fate, the nurse who was supposed to care for Arnold's mother, but neglected to do so; the police officer who arrested Arnold, and the lawyer who sold out Arnold at the trial. All their deaths are made to look like accidents, which baffles the police - most notably, Lt. Jeff Morgan (Paul Burke).

Lt. Morgan pieces together the connection of the victims to Arnold, and visits Arnold's house one night. Morgan is determined to get to the bottom of all these deaths, even though he has no evidence linking Arnold to the murders. Morgan is soon joined by Arnold's doctor, Laura Scott (Julie Adams), who tried to help Arnold during his time in the institution, and a colleague of hers, Dr. Gubner (Nehemiah Persoff).

Before long, Morgan decides to put an end to Arnold's murderous spree. Morgan recalls a conversation where Arnold can be medically dead while in his trance. While Arnold is having another out-of-body experience, Morgan goes over to his house and has the medical examiner take Arnold's physical body to the crematorium, but not before he has the medical examiner declare him dead. While Morgan is having Arnold's body loaded into an oven at the crematorium, Arnold's astral form sees Laura in his house. Just as Arnold is talking to Laura, he suddenly lets out a horrible scream. Arnold's astral form realizes that his physical body is being burned alive in the crematorium oven. Arnold wakes up in the oven, screaming in agony until he is burned to death.

Cast     
Paul Burke as Police Lt. Jeff Morgan
Jim Hutton as Arnold James Masters
Julie Adams as Dr. Laura Scott
Nehemiah Persoff as Dr. Gubner
Neville Brand as Lemonowski
Aldo Ray as Lt. Dave Anderson
Whit Bissell as Dr. Paul Taylor
Rod Cameron as Dr. Commanger
Della Reese as Mrs. Gibson
Mary Charlotte Wilcox as Nurse Burnson 
Judith Brown as Anne Turner
Joseph Della Sorte as Harvey B. Sanders
Greydon Clark as Police Sgt. Marv Sowash
Harry Holcombe as Judge
Robin Raymond as Jury Foreman 
Jerry James as Dr. Cummings
Diane Deininger as Arnold's Mother
John Dennis as Frank
Bill Quinn as Hospital Coroner
Marland Proctor as Motorcycle Cop
Walter O. Miles as Coroner 
Stack Pierce as Emilio
Mello Alexandria as Cop
Sandra Rustam as Young Girl

References

External links 
 

1975 films
Astral projection in popular culture
American supernatural horror films
1975 horror films
Embassy Pictures films
1970s slasher films
American slasher films
1970s English-language films
1970s American films